Andrew Matthews (born ) is a British bobsledder.

Matthews competed at the 2014 Winter Olympics for Great Britain. He teamed with driver Lamin Deen, John Baines and Ben Simons in the Great Britain-2 sled in the four-man event, finishing 19th. He was a late replacement after Craig Pickering was injured.

As of April 2014, his best showing at the World Championships is 23rd, coming in the four-man event in 2013.

Matthews was born in Slough, and made his World Cup debut in December 2012. As of April 2014, his best finish is 8th, in a four-man event in 2012–13 at Winterberg.

Matthews was a member of the British gold medal winning 4x100 metre relay team at the 2003 European Athletics Junior Championships

References

External links
 
 
 
 

1984 births
Living people
Olympic bobsledders of Great Britain
Sportspeople from Slough
Bobsledders at the 2014 Winter Olympics
Bobsledders at the 2018 Winter Olympics
British male bobsledders